Charles William Frederick (12 May 1712 – 3 August 1757), nicknamed der Wilde Markgraf (the Wild Margrave), was the margrave of the Principality of Ansbach from 1723 to his death.

Early life 
Charles William Frederick was the son of William Frederick, Margrave of Brandenburg-Ansbach (1686–1723) and his wife Duchess Christiane Charlotte of Württemberg (1694–1729). During his youth, his mother ruled as regent.

Biography 
When he came to power, Charles William Frederick ruled as a typical absolute monarch with a luxurious court life. He left his heir Charles Alexander a total debt of 2.3 million Reichsthaler, and he spent 10% of the state budget on hunting. He had 56 churches and many palaces built, among them a building in Triesdorf for his falcons, his greatest passion, on which he spent more than a half million guilders between 1730 and 1748. His love of hunting, particularly with his falcons, is what earned him his nickname, the Wild Margrave.

Charles William Frederick died of a stroke on 3 August 1757.

Marriage and children 

Charles William Frederick married Princess Friederike Luise of Prussia (1714–1784), daughter of King Frederick William I of Prussia. They had two children:
 Charles Frederick Augustus (7 April 1733 – 9 May 1737)
 Charles Alexander, Margrave of Brandenburg-Ansbach (24 February 1736 – 5 January 1806)

He also had four children with his mistress Elisabeth Wünsch, a falconer's daughter. Both illegitimate sons, Friedrich Karl (1734–1796) and Friedrich Ferdinand Ludwig (1748–1811), and daughters Wilhelmine Eleonore (1743–1768) and Louise Charlotte (1746–1747) received palaces and the titles Freiherren and Freiinen von Falkenhausen.

Ancestors

External links
Biography

Margraves of Brandenburg-Ansbach

Knights of the Garter

1712 births

1757 deaths